Caloptilia pentaphylactis is a moth of the family Gracillariidae. It is known from Papua New Guinea.

References

pentaphylactis
Moths of Asia
Moths described in 1938